Tolstikovo is a rural locality (a village) in Voskresenskoye Rural Settlement, Cherepovetsky District, Vologda Oblast, Russia. The population was 5 as of 2002.

Geography 
Tolstikovo is located 39 km north of Cherepovets (the district's administrative centre) by road. Maloye Kalinnikovo is the nearest rural locality.

References 

Rural localities in Cherepovetsky District